A Family Affair is a musical with a book by James Goldman and William Goldman, lyrics by James Goldman and John Kander, and music by Kander.  This was Kander's first show and his only one written without Fred Ebb in Ebb's lifetime.

Synopsis
In Chicago, Gerry Siegal and Sally Nathan, a young suburban Chicago couple, decide to marry.

The bride's Uncle Alfie (her guardian) wants an intimate wedding and wages a war of words with the groom's entire family. The groom's brassy Jewish mother Tillie commandeers the planning, steering it towards a large country club wedding (despite her husband's scolding her for taking over). Caterers, dressmakers, band leaders, rabbis, florists, photographers and a bossy wedding planner are pushed to the limit by the madcap preparations.

The bride and groom, who have retained their sanity, realize that their families have almost destroyed the wedding. They announce their intention to have a quiet family affair.

Song list

Act I     
Anything for You
Beautiful
My Son, the Lawyer
Every Girl Wants to Get Married
Right Girls
Kalua Bay
There's a Room in My House
Siegal Marching Song
Nathan Marching Song
Harmony

Act II     
Now, Morris
Wonderful Party
Revenge
Summer is Over
Harmony (Reprise)
I'm Worse Than Anybody
What I Say Goes
The Wedding

Background
The three collaborators on the show, William and James Goldman, and John Kander, had all been friends for a long time and shared an apartment in New York City. Although all three would enjoy great success, when the musical was written only William Goldman was doing well in his career. He later remembered:
They were older than I was, Kander and my brother, and they were the ones who were supposed to succeed and they weren't I was. It terrified me and I wrote a musical with my brother and Kander, A Family Affair, which got on, which failed. I don't know why I did it. Here were these two wonderful figures for me and I was doing well and they weren't and I helped them in my own nutty way. Except it didn't work out that way, since everything I tried for the theatre failed.
William Goldman says the idea for the musical was his. It was originally optioned by Leland Hayward and when he dropped the option their agent, Richard Seff, talked his cousin Andrew into producing it. Money was raised by doing live auditions, according to Seff:
Jim couldn't sing a note, Bill can't really sing but John Kander can a little bit, so Kander would play and sing and Bill would sing with him and then I had to get up and sing with them too so here was the agent playing actor. There were thirty people, fifty people, and we'd raise the thousand dollars one night and two thousand the next and we put together the whole show that way.
The credits are shared by all three equally. "I would not say I was a major contributor to the lyrics, but we all decided the three of us would take the billing," remembers William Goldman.

Production history
Originally planned as a project for Gertrude Berg to be directed by Jerome Robbins, it opened in Philadelphia directed instead by Word Baker, who recently had staged The Fantasticks off-Broadway. With everything from the script to the score to the set in disarray, theatre producer Hal Prince was brought in to replace Baker and repair the damage. Poor box office prevented the out-of-town tryout from being extended and Prince, making his directorial debut, brought the show to New York City knowing it was better but still in need of serious work.

The Broadway production opened on January 27, 1962, at the Billy Rose Theatre, where it ran for 65 performances and five previews. The cast included Shelley Berman as Alfie, Eileen Heckart as Tillie, Rita Gardner as Sally, and Larry Kert as Gerry, with Morris Carnovsky, Cathryn Damon, Bibi Osterwald, and Linda Lavin in supporting roles.

According to Richard Seff:
We kept it alive, barely. It earned a living for those nine weeks but it never made any profit to speak of and to go on longer would have meant to take big losses so it was sensible to close it... When we first heard it, we thought it had great charm. But I think it would have been helped by a director who really understood big musicals and Wood Baker had just had the great success with Fantastiks, which was only a few people in a tiny, tiny theatre, and he did that one imaginatively, but this one he did not do imaginatively and it was very clunky. A lot depends on the director in a musical. He really can make fair material much better and a bad director can take excellent material and make it worse... Hal Prince took over the direction out of town. He helped it a lot. It got better. It just didn't get good enough.
An original cast recording was released by United Artists Records.

References

Not Since Carrie: Forty Years of Broadway Musical Flops by Ken Mandelbaum, published by St. Martin's Press (1991), pages 141–42
A Family Affair at the Music Theatre International Website
Egan, Sean, William Goldman: The Reluctant Storyteller, Bear Manor Media 2014

External links
Internet Broadway Database listing
A Family Affair plot summary & character descriptions
Profile at guidetomusicaltheatre.com

1962 musicals
Broadway musicals
Musicals by James Goldman
Musicals by William Goldman
Chicago in fiction